Ryan Ward (born January 2, 1979) is a Canadian actor, film director and screenwriter. He is best known for his debut feature film as a director, Son of the Sunshine, for which Ward and Matthew Heiti were shortlisted Genie Award nominees for Best Original Screenplay at the 32nd Genie Awards in 2012.

Originally from Winnipeg, Manitoba, he is now based primarily in Toronto, Ontario. As an actor, he had primarily supporting roles in films, including Nostradamus, We Ate the Children Last and Sidekick, prior to Son of the Sunshine, as well as a long-running stage role in the original production of Evil Dead The Musical.

References

External links

Canadian male film actors
Canadian male musical theatre actors
Canadian male screenwriters
1979 births
Male actors from Winnipeg
Writers from Winnipeg
Film directors from Winnipeg
Living people
21st-century Canadian screenwriters